Yekaterina Nikolayevna Mulyuk-Timofeyeva or Katsiaryna Mikalayeuna Muliuk (born 13 November 1976) is a Belarusian archer. She competed in the individual event at the 2008 and 2012 Summer Olympics and finished in 23rd and 17th place, respectively. She won a silver team medal at the 2013 World Archery Championships.

At the 2008 Games she competed as Katsiaryna Muliuk. By the next Olympics she got married, gave birth and changed her name. She graduated from the Mozyr State Pedagogical University in Belarus with a degree in pedagogy in physical education.

References

External links
 

Belarusian female archers
1976 births
Living people
Archers at the 2008 Summer Olympics
Archers at the 2012 Summer Olympics
Olympic archers of Belarus
Archers at the 2015 European Games
European Games medalists in archery
European Games silver medalists for Belarus
World Archery Championships medalists
People from Mazyr
Sportspeople from Gomel Region